On March 3, 2006, the United States Department of Defense partially complied with a court order and released 53 PDF files that contained several hundred Combatant Status Review Tribunal transcripts.

Most of the transcripts were only identified by an ISN in the lower right hand corner of each page. It was not until April 20, 2006, that the Department of Defense released an official list of the captives' names, ISNs and nationalities.

On September 6, 2006, United States President George W. Bush announced the transfer of fourteen "high value detainees" from CIA custody to Guantanamo. These fourteen men had their Tribunals in the spring of 2007, and their transcripts were released one at a time, shortly thereafter.

Because the press was not allowed to attend their Tribunals, their transcripts were verbatim—not summarized.  The press was barred in order to avoid revealing "national security" secrets. The CIA director later acknowledged that several of these captives, including Khalid Sheikh Mohammed and Abu Zubaydah had been subjected to the controversial technique known as "waterboarding".

Six further captives have been transferred to Guantanamo since September 6, 2006. In theory, they too should have their enemy combatant status confirmed by a Combatant Status Review Tribunal, but the DoD has not made public any plans to do so.

References

Guantanamo Bay captives legal and administrative procedures